South Brunswick is a township in Middlesex County, in the U.S. state of New Jersey. The township is centrally located within the Raritan Valley region and is an outer-ring suburb of New York City in the New York metropolitan area. As of the 2020 United States census, the township's population was 47,043, its highest ever decennial census count and an increase of 3,626 (+8.4%) from the 2010 census count of 43,417, which in turn reflected an increase of 5,683 (+15.1%) from the 37,734 counted in the 2000 census.

South Brunswick was first mentioned in Freeholder minutes on February 28, 1778, as being formed from New Brunswick Township. It was formally incorporated as one of New Jersey's initial group of 104 townships on February 21, 1798. Portions of the township have been taken to form Cranbury (as of March 7, 1872) and Plainsboro (on April 1, 1919).

Niche.com placed Monmouth Junction in the top 10 of its “2021 Best Places to Live in New Jersey”. In 2021, SafeWise placed South Brunswick in the “100 Safest Cities in America”.

History

South Brunswick Township was incorporated by an act of the New Jersey Legislature on February 21, 1798. In the 18th and 19th centuries, the community was primarily agricultural. The Straight Turnpike, now Route 1, was constructed in 1804. The township got its name from New Brunswick, which in turn was named after the city of Braunschweig (called Brunswick in the Low German language), in state of Lower Saxony, in Germany. Braunschweig was an influential and powerful city in the Hanseatic League, later in the Holy Roman Empire, and was an administrative seat for the Duchy (and later Principality) of Hanover. Shortly after the first settlement of New Brunswick in colonial New Jersey, George, Duke of Brunswick-Lüneburg, and Elector of Hanover, of the House of Hanover (also known as the House of Brunswick), became King George I of Great Britain (1660–1727). Alternatively, the city derived its name from King George II of Great Britain, the Duke of Brunswick-Lüneburg.

In 1872, the Legislature first reduced the size of South Brunswick with the creation of the separate Cranbury from the southern portion of South Brunswick. In 1885, it redefined and enlarged the boundaries of Cranbury, and Plainsboro was formed in 1919. The present boundaries of South Brunswick date back to this last change.

During the 20th century, South Brunswick saw extensive transformation with the impact of changes in transportation technology. The New Brunswick and Trenton Fast Line began operation in 1900, a trolley line running parallel to the Old Straight Turnpike of 1804 (Route 1), intersecting George's Road just north of the Five Corners intersection in Dayton. This trolley provided daily passenger and freight service, stopping at a local crossroads. The New Jersey Turnpike opened in 1951, again roughly parallel to Route 1, on the eastern edge of the Township. One effect of the Turnpike opening up Interchange 8A (just outside the township) was the transformation of the agricultural area on the southeast corner of South Brunswick to that of a burgeoning industrial development. Significant portions of land between Route 130 and the turnpike consist largely of warehouses.

In 1980, the township's population approached 18,000. In 1990, this figure reached 25,792 and by 2020, South Brunswick had over 47,000 residents. Much of the township's  remain undeveloped and there are still significant amounts of wetlands, woodlands, and open space within the community.

Geography
According to the United States Census Bureau, the township had a total area of 41.02 square miles (106.23 km2), including 40.61 square miles (105.19 km2) of land and 0.40 square miles (1.04 km2) of water (0.98%).

Dayton (2020 Census population of 8,138), Heathcote (7,154), Kendall Park (9,989), Kingston (1,581) and Monmouth Junction (8,895) are unincorporated communities and census-designated places (CDPs) located within South Brunswick.

Other unincorporated communities, localities and place names located partially or completely within the township include: Cottageville, Deans, Franklin Park, Fresh Ponds, Little Rocky Hill, Sand Hills, South Brunswick Terrace and Ten Mile Run.

Because the township is served by several different zip codes, Dayton, Monmouth Junction, Kendall Park, Kingston, Jamesburg, Cranbury, Princeton and even North Brunswick are often used in place of the township's name, even when referring to areas located beyond their defined boundaries.

Dayton was first known simply as The Cross Roads, where James Whitlock built a tavern on Georges Road around 1750. Early enterprises included a brick manufacturer and a large nursery. In 1866, the name was changed from Cross Roads to Dayton, in honor of William L. Dayton, an attorney for the Freehold and Jamesburg Agricultural Railroad. Dayton had helped settle disputes arising from the location of a railroad right-of-way. He was later a United States Senator, was the first Republican nominee for Vice President (in 1856), and Minister to France.

Deans originated from its location on both Crosswicknung Trail (Georges Road) and Lawrence Brook. Dams were built on the brook, creating Deans Pond.

With increased mobility and a growing population, the suburban-style residential development was born after World War II, and Kendall Park was begun in the 1950s. Kendall Park is located off Route 27, the old Indian trail and major thoroughfare of earlier centuries.

Kingston's location on the Lenape Assunpink Trail where it crossed the Millstone River was the prime factor in its early prominence. Kingston was by far the most active and important community, being situated on both the heavily traveled King's Road and Millstone River, combining commercial activities of both mills and taverns. The Kingston Village Advisory Committee, jointly appointed by the South Brunswick and Franklin Township Councils, reports to the Township Council on matters of concern to residents of Kingston. Kingston has been designated as a Village Center by the New Jersey State Planning Commission and is overseen by an advisory commission that consists of seven members from Franklin Township and South Brunswick.

Monmouth Junction was created as the junction of three rail branches, the New York division of the Pennsylvania Railroad, the Rocky Hill and the Jamesburg and Freehold Railroad.

The Lawrence Brook, a tributary of the Raritan River, flows through the center of the township. The area also lies within the Manalapan Brook watershed in the eastern portion of the township and the Millstone River watershed in the western portion of the township, which are both also subwatersheds within the Raritan Basin.

Pigeon Swamp State Park is a New Jersey state park located on Deans Rhode Hall Road (Middlesex CR-610). The park has  of undeveloped land.

The Pigeon Swamp Ledger is a 1780 document that is an accounting log of South Brunswick landowners regarding the draining of the Pigeon Swamp.  This was made possible by a New Jersey Act of Legislature.

The township borders Cranbury Township, East Brunswick Township, Monroe Township, North Brunswick Township and Plainsboro Township in Middlesex County; Princeton in Mercer County; and Franklin Township in Somerset County.

Climate
South Brunswick is in the humid continental climate zone. The summertime lows range from  degrees. About  of rain falls every month and is evenly spread throughout the year, though the area can go through long periods of drought or long-lasting periods with little to no rain. During winter and early spring, South Brunswick can in some years experience "nor'easters", which are capable of causing blizzards or flooding throughout the northeastern United States. Hurricanes and tropical storms (such as Hurricane Irene in 2011), tornadoes, and earthquakes are rare.

Demographics

2020 census
The 2020 United States census  counted 47,043 people in the township, which was a gain of 8.4% from the 2010 census. The racial makeup was 48.1% Asian, 35.5% white, 7.6% Black, 7.5%, and 5.5% reported two or more races. 7.5% of respondents reported Latino ethnicity. There were 16,647 households in the township.

2010 census

The Census Bureau's 2006–2010 American Community Survey showed that (in 2010 inflation-adjusted dollars) median household income was $100,950 (with a margin of error of +/− $2,777) and the median family income was $116,127 (+/− $5,529). Males had a median income of $81,297 (+/− $2,632) versus $55,477 (+/− $3,835) for females. The per capita income for the borough was $40,468 (+/− $1,430). About 2.1% of families and 3.1% of the population were below the poverty line, including 3.4% of those under age 18 and 5.6% of those age 65 or over.

2000 census
As of the 2000 United States census there were 37,734 people, 13,428 households, and 10,084 families residing in the township.  The population density was 923.5 people per square mile (356.6/km2).  There were 13,862 housing units at an average density of 339.3 per square mile (131.0/km2).  The racial makeup of the township was 70.49% White, 7.88% African American, 0.13% Native American, 18.04% Asian, 0.04% Pacific Islander, 1.37% from other races, and 2.04% from two or more races. Hispanic or Latino of any race were 5.08% of the population.

As of the 2000 census, 10.48% of South Brunswick's residents identified themselves as being of Indian American ancestry, which was the seventh-highest of any municipality in the United States and the fourth highest in New Jersey – behind Edison (17.75%), Plainsboro Township (16.97%) and Piscataway Township (12.49%) – of all places with 1,000 or more residents identifying their ancestry.

There were 13,428 households, out of which 43.0% had children under the age of 18 living with them, 63.8% were married couples living together, 8.6% had a female householder with no husband present, and 24.9% were non-families. 19.6% of all households were made up of individuals, and 4.3% had someone living alone who was 65 years of age or older.  The average household size was 2.80 and the average family size was 3.27.

In the township, the population was spread out, with 28.4% under the age of 18, 5.7% from 18 to 24, 36.7% from 25 to 44, 21.8% from 45 to 64, and 7.3% who were 65 years of age or older.  The median age was 35 years. For every 100 females, there were 94.0 males.  For every 100 females age 18 and over, there were 91.3 males.

The median income for a household in the township was $78,737, and the median income for a family was $86,891. Males had a median income of $61,637 versus $41,554 for females. The per capita income for the township was $32,104.  About 2.1% of families and 3.1% of the population were below the poverty line, including 2.9% of those under age 18 and 4.5% of those age 65 or over.

Economy

Top employers
Major employers in the township include:

Government

Local government 
South Brunswick operates within the Faulkner Act, formally known as the Optional Municipal Charter Law, under the Council-Manager form of municipal government. The township is one of 42 municipalities (of the 564) statewide that use this form of government. The governing body is comprised of the Mayor and the four-member Township Council. Members of the Township Council are elected at-large to four-year terms in partisan elections on a staggered basis with two seats up for election in even-numbered years. The mayoral seat is up for election directly by the voters. At a reorganization meeting held in January after each election, the council selects a deputy mayor from among its members.

, members of the Township Council are Mayor Charles Carley (D, term as mayor ends December 31, 2022), Deputy Mayor Joseph J. Camarota Jr. (D, 2024), Kenneth Bierman (D, 2022), Archana "Ann" Grover (D, 2024) and Josephine "Jo" Hochman (D, 2024).

Federal, state and county representation 
South Brunswick is located in the 12th Congressional District and is part of New Jersey's 16th state legislative district. Prior to the 2011 reapportionment following the 2010 Census, South Brunswick had been in the 14th state legislative district.

 

Middlesex County is governed by a Board of County Commissioners, whose seven members are elected at-large on a partisan basis to serve three-year terms of office on a staggered basis, with either two or three seats coming up for election each year as part of the November general election. At an annual reorganization meeting held in January, the board selects from among its members a commissioner director and deputy director. , Middlesex County's Commissioners (with party affiliation, term-end year, and residence listed in parentheses) are 
Commissioner Director Ronald G. Rios (D, Carteret, term as commissioner ends December 31, 2024; term as commissioner director ends 2022),
Commissioner Deputy Director Shanti Narra (D, North Brunswick, term as commissioner ends 2024; term as deputy director ends 2022),
Claribel A. "Clary" Azcona-Barber (D, New Brunswick, 2022),
Charles Kenny (D, Woodbridge Township, 2022),
Leslie Koppel (D, Monroe Township, 2023),
Chanelle Scott McCullum (D, Piscataway, 2024) and 
Charles E. Tomaro (D, Edison, 2023).
Constitutional officers are
County Clerk Nancy Pinkin (D, 2025, East Brunswick),
Sheriff Mildred S. Scott (D, 2022, Piscataway) and 
Surrogate Claribel Cortes (D, 2026; North Brunswick).

Politics
As of November 2, 2021, there were a total of 34,403 registered voters in South Brunswick.

In the United States Presidential Election of 2020, Democrat Joseph Biden received 68.7%votes (16,351 cast), ahead of Republican candidate Donald J. Trump who received 30.1%votes (7,163 cast), and other candidates Jo Jorgensen with 139 votes and Howie Hawkins with 88 votes, among the 24,176 total ballots cast with 32,470 registered voters. In the United States Presidential Election of 2016, Democrat Hillary Clinton received 65.3% votes (12,827 cast), ahead of Republican candidate Donald J. Trump who received 31.5% votes (6,197 cast), and other candidates Gary Johnson with 372 votes and Jill Stein with 197 votes, among the 20,021 total ballots cast with 29,447 registered voters. In the 2012 presidential election, Democrat Barack Obama received 64.3% of the vote (11,583 cast), ahead of Republican Mitt Romney with 34.6% (6,233 votes), and other candidates with 1.1% (194 votes), among the 18,141 ballots cast by the township's 25,947 registered voters (131 ballots were spoiled), for a turnout of 69.9%. In the 2008 presidential election, Democrat Barack Obama received 62.7% of the vote (11,452 cast), ahead of Republican John McCain with 35.7% (6,530 votes) and other candidates with 1.0% (176 votes), among the 18,275 ballots cast by the township's 24,803 registered voters, for a turnout of 73.7%. In the 2004 presidential election, Democrat John Kerry received 56.8% of the vote (9,346 ballots cast), outpolling Republican George W. Bush with 42.1% (6,925 votes) and other candidates with 0.6% (128 votes), among the 16,457 ballots cast by the township's 22,147 registered voters, for a turnout percentage of 74.3.

In the 2021 gubernatorial election, Democrat Philip Murphy received 64.8% of the vote (8,541 votes), ahead of Republican Jack Ciattarelli with 34.3% (4,526 votes), and other candidates with 0.9% (122 votes), among the 13,332 votes cast by the township's 34,403 registered voters. In the 2017 gubernatorial election, Democrat Philip Murphy received 63.6%% of the vote (6,957 votes), ahead of Republican Kim Guadagno with 34.4% (3,757 votes), and other candidates with 2.0% (218 votes), among the 11,073 votes cast by the township's 28,647 registered voters. In the 2013 gubernatorial election, Republican Chris Christie received 59.1% of the vote (5,608 cast), ahead of Democrat Barbara Buono with 39.6% (3,755 votes), and other candidates with 1.3% (128 votes), among the 9,576 ballots cast by the township's 26,340 registered voters (85 ballots were spoiled), for a turnout of 36.4%. In the 2009 gubernatorial election, Republican Chris Christie received 47.3% of the vote (5,355 ballots cast), ahead of Democrat Jon Corzine with 44.1% (4,991 votes), Independent Chris Daggett with 6.7% (758 votes) and other candidates with 0.8% (90 votes), among the 11,311 ballots cast by the township's 23,974 registered voters, yielding a 47.2% turnout.

Education 
The South Brunswick Public Schools serves students in pre-kindergarten through twelfth grade. The district has grown substantially in recent decades, with district enrollment more than doubling in the two decades from 1991 and high school enrollment doubling to nearly 2,000 in the decade prior to 2001, and increasing by another 1,000 in the subsequent decade.

As of the 2018–19 school year, the district, comprised of 10 schools, had an enrollment of 8,623 students and 634.5 classroom teachers (on an FTE basis), for a student–teacher ratio of 13.6:1. Schools in the district (with 2018–19 enrollment data from the National Center for Education Statistics) are 
Brooks Crossing and Deans Elementary School (589 students; in grades K–5), 
Brunswick Acres Elementary School (534; K–5), 
Cambridge Elementary School (512; Pre-K–5), 
Constable Elementary School (470; K–5), 
Greenbrook Elementary School (379; K–5), 
Indian Fields and Dayton Elementary School (668; K–5), 
Monmouth Junction Elementary School (347; Pre-K–5), 
Crossroads North Middle School (843; 6–8), 
Crossroads South Middle School (1,107; 6–8) and 
South Brunswick High School (2,977; 9–12).

St. Augustine of Canterbury School is Pre-K–8 elementary school in Kendall Park operating under the auspices of the Roman Catholic Diocese of Metuchen. In 2016, the school was one of ten schools in New Jersey, and one of the private schools, recognized as a National Blue Ribbon School by the United States Department of Education, a recognition celebrating excellence in academics.

Religion

It was established in October 1991, and in 1993 had 20–25 attendees per Sunday church worship.

Transportation

Roads and highways

The most prominent highway passing through South Brunswick is a  section of the New Jersey Turnpike (Interstate 95). This highway crosses the eastern part of the township, and a few ramps that lead to the toll gate for Interchange 8A pass through the township, with the majority of the interchange just outside the municipality's border in Monroe Township. Other major highways that the township also hosts include U.S. Route 1, U.S. Route 130, Route 27 and Route 32. A few county routes, such as 535 and 522, pass through the township.

A number of proposed Turnpike Authority maintained roads were to traverse South Brunswick. This was cancelled in the 1980s. The other proposed road was a west-east spur, Route 92. While the majority of the spur was to be in South Brunswick, it was to begin at US 1, just north of the intersection with Ridge Road in South Brunswick, and terminate at the tollgate for Exit 8A. However this was cancelled on December 1, 2006.

Public transportation
Near the intersection of Route 32 and 130, there is a park and ride, where commuters can take buses to New York City. Suburban Transit offers service on Line 300 to the Port Authority Bus Terminal, Grand Central Terminal and Manhattan's East Side, while Line 600 serves Downtown Manhattan / Wall Street.

Commuter bus service to Midtown Manhattan is also offered by discount commuter transportation company OurBus, during peak hours.

The Middlesex County Area Transit (MCAT) Shuttle offers scheduled service across the county, with connections to NJ Transit buses and train service.

The Monmouth Ocean Middlesex Line is a proposal by New Jersey Transit to restore passenger railway service to the region. Herrod Boulevard and Monmouth Junction (where the line would conjoin with the Northeast Corridor) would be potential stops on the 'MOM' Line in South Brunswick.

The nearest train stations to the township are located at Princeton Junction and New Brunswick along the Northeast Corridor Line.

Notable people

People who were born in, residents of, or otherwise closely associated with South Brunswick include:

 Leon Bibel (1913–1995), Polish-born American painter and printmaker during the Great Depression
 Mya Breitbart (born 1978), Professor of Biological Oceanography at the University of South Florida's College of Marine Science who was awarded Popular Science magazine's 'Brilliant 10' for 2013
 Mike Elko (born 1977), head coach for the Duke Blue Devils football team
 Donald Fagen (born 1948), musician and songwriter, best known as the co-founder of the rock band Steely Dan
 Edith King (1896–1973), stage and film actress
 Kirsten Lepore (born 1985), writer, director and animator at Marvel Studios.
 Ed Moran (born 1981), retired track and road runner who specialized in various long-distance disciplines who was a gold medalist in the 5000-meter race at the 2007 Pan American Games
 David Neumann (born 1965), dancer, actor, and Tony nominated choreographer
 Walter Perez, weekend morning co-anchor, journalist and weekday reporter for WPVI-TV, the ABC network affiliate in Philadelphia
 Steven Portnoy (born 1981), CBS News Radio White House correspondent
 Anna Quindlen (born 1952), best-selling author, journalist, and Pulitzer Prize-winning opinion columnist
 Ricardo Romero (born 1978), MMA fighter
 Mohamed Sanu (born 1989), wide receiver for the San Francisco 49ers
 Sydney Schneider (born 1999), goalkeeper for the UNC Wilmington Seahawks and the Jamaica women's national football team
 George Segal (1924–2000), painter and sculptor associated with the Pop Art movement, who was presented with a National Medal of Arts in 1999

 DeForest Soaries (born 1951), pastor and former chairman of the Election Assistance Commission
 Katherine S. Squibb (1949–2018), toxicologist who specialized in metal toxicity
 C. Vivian Stringer (born 1948), head coach for the Rutgers Scarlet Knights women's basketball team and one of the winningest coaches in women's college basketball history
 Tammy Tibbetts (born ), co-founder and CEO of the non-profit organization She's the First
 Isaiah Wong (born 2001), point guard / shooting guard for the Miami Hurricanes men's basketball team of the Atlantic Coast Conference (ACC)
 Andrew Zwicker (born 1964), a physicist at the Princeton Plasma Physics Laboratory and a member of the New Jersey General Assembly representing the 16th Legislative District since January 2016

References

External links

South Brunswick website
South Brunswick Public Schools

School Data for the South Brunswick Public Schools, National Center for Education Statistics

 
1798 establishments in New Jersey
Faulkner Act (council–manager)
Populated places established in 1798
Townships in Middlesex County, New Jersey